Northwest Christian Schools International (NWCSI) is a community of Christian Schools in the Northwest Region of Christian Schools International (CSI) in the northwest region of North America.  NWCSI provides leadership and resources to enable its member schools to better serve their students and nurture them in Christian teachings.

NWCSI is dedicated to serving the schools and the students of member schools in the promotion and development of education that acknowledges Christian teaching in life and education.

External links
 NWCSI official home page

Nondenominational Christian schools in the United States
Private and independent school organizations in the United States